The Verdict is a 1982 American legal drama film directed by Sidney Lumet and written by David Mamet, adapted from Barry Reed's 1980 novel of the same name. It stars Paul Newman, Charlotte Rampling, Jack Warden, James Mason, Milo O'Shea, and Lindsay Crouse. A down-on-his-luck alcoholic lawyer accepts a medical malpractice case to improve his own situation, but discovers along the way that he is doing the right thing.

The Verdict garnered critical acclaim and box office success. The film was nominated for five Academy Awards, including Best Picture, Best Director, Best Actor in a Leading Role (Newman), Best Actor in a Supporting Role (Mason), and Best Adapted Screenplay.

Plot

Once-promising attorney Frank Galvin is an alcoholic ambulance chaser. As a favor, former partner Mickey Morrissey sends him a medical malpractice case which is all but certain to be settled out-of-court for a significant amount. The case involves a young woman given general anesthesia during childbirth at a Catholic hospital, after which she choked on her vomit and was left comatose. The plaintiffs, her sister and brother-in-law, intend to use the settlement to pay for her care.

Galvin is deeply affected upon seeing the woman. A representative of the Catholic diocese offers a $210,000 settlement. Without his clients' knowledge, Galvin declines and states his intention to take the case to trial, stunning the opposing party and the judge assigned to the case. While preparing for trial, Galvin encounters Laura in a bar and becomes romantically involved with her.

Galvin experiences several setbacks. The hospital's attorney, Ed Concannon, has a large legal team that is masterful with the press. The comatose woman's brother-in-law angrily confronts Galvin after Concannon's team tells him of the settlement offer that Galvin rejected. Galvin's medical expert disappears before testifying, and a hastily-arranged substitute's credentials are challenged. Nobody who was in the operating room is willing to testify that negligence occurred.

In chambers during the trial, Judge Hoyle threatens Galvin with disbarment, but Galvin angrily dismisses him as a bagman and "defendant's judge" who couldn't "hack it" as a lawyer. Hoyle denies Galvin's motion for a mistrial and threatens to have him arrested. Galvin storms out.

Kaitlin Costello, the nurse who admitted the woman to the hospital, is now a pre-school teacher in New York City. Galvin travels there to seek her help. As Laura hastily arranges to meet him, Morrissey discovers a check from Concannon in her handbag and realizes Concannon is paying her for inside information. Morrissey informs Galvin of Laura's betrayal, and Galvin confronts her in a bar. He strikes her, knocking her to the floor. Back in Boston, Morrissey suggests moving for a mistrial due to Concannon's ethics violation, but Galvin decides to continue.

In the courtroom, Costello testifies she wrote that the patient ate a full meal one hour before being admitted, which contradicts the patient record that states a nine-hour interval. On cross-examination, an incredulous Concannon asks how she can prove this. Costello reveals that her superiors threatened her with termination unless she changed the original record from "1" to "9," but before doing so, she made a photocopy, which she brought to court. Concannon objects that for legal purposes, the original is presumed to be correct, but Hoyle unexpectedly reserves judgment. Costello testifies that the anesthesiologist later confessed that he had failed to read her admitting notes and administered general anesthesia, which is incorrect for someone who ate only one hour prior. As a result, the patient vomited and choked. When the anesthesiologist realized his error, he threatened to end Costello's career if she did not change the "1" to a "9."

After Costello is dismissed, Concannon again objects on the grounds that the hospital's original admitting record has precedence. Hoyle agrees and declares Costello's testimony stricken from the record. Afterward, a diocese lawyer praises Concannon's performance to the bishop, who asks, "But do you believe her?" and is met with embarrassed silence.

Despite believing his case is hopeless, Galvin gives a brief but passionate closing argument. The jury finds in favor of the plaintiffs, and the foreman asks whether the jury can award more than what was asked for. Hoyle resignedly replies that they can. As Galvin is congratulated outside the courtroom, he catches a glimpse of Laura watching him from across the atrium.

That night, a drunk Laura drops her whiskey on the floor, drags her telephone towards her, and dials Galvin's office number. As his phone rings, Frank sits with a cup of coffee. He moves to answer the call but changes his mind and lets the phone continue to ring.

Cast

 Paul Newman as Attorney Frank Galvin
 Charlotte Rampling as Laura Fischer
 Jack Warden as Attorney Mickey Morrissey
 James Mason as Attorney Ed Concannon
 Milo O'Shea as Judge Hoyle
 Lindsay Crouse as Kaitlin Costello Price
 Edward Binns as Bishop Brophy
 Julie Bovasso as Maureen Rooney
 Roxanne Hart as Sally Doneghy, the victim's sister
 James Handy as Kevin Doneghy
 Wesley Addy as Dr. Towler
 Joe Seneca as Dr. Thompson
 Lewis J. Stadlen as Dr. Gruber
 Kent Broadhurst as Joseph Alito
 Colin Stinton as Billy
 Tobin Bell as Courtroom Observer (uncredited)
 Bruce Willis as Courtroom Observer (uncredited)

Production
Film rights to Reed’s novel were bought by the team of Richard Zanuck and David Brown. A number of actors, including Roy Scheider, William Holden, Frank Sinatra, Cary Grant and Dustin Hoffman, expressed interest in the project because of the strength of the lead role. Arthur Hiller was originally attached to direct while David Mamet was hired to write a screenplay.

Though Mamet had made a name for himself in the theater, he was still new to screenwriting (his first film credit had come in 1978). The producers were uncertain whether Mamet would take the job given the standards he set with his own previous work, but according to Lindsay Crouse, who was then married to Mamet, the film was actually a big deal for him. Crouse also recalled Mamet struggling initially with Galvin's closing summation, but he finally came up with the scene after staying up an entire evening working on it.

Mamet's original draft ended the film after the jury left the courtroom for deliberations, giving no resolution to the case. Neither Zanuck nor Brown believed they could make the film without showing what happened, and Zanuck met with Mamet to convince him to re-write the ending. However, Mamet told Zanuck that the ending he wanted was "old-fashioned" and would hurt the film. He also reacted negatively to Zanuck's use of sarcasm to make his point, as Zanuck claimed his copy of the script was missing its final pages before telling Mamet the film title would need a question mark after it.

Hiller also disliked Mamet's script, and left the project. The producers commissioned another screenplay from Jay Presson Allen, which they preferred, and they were later approached by Robert Redford to star in the film when he obtained a copy of the script from Allen.

Redford suggested James Bridges as a writer-director, and he had Bridges write several drafts of the screenplay, more or less sanitizing the lead character as he was concerned about playing a hard-drinking womanizer. Neither the producers nor Redford were happy with the rewrites and soon Bridges left the project. Redford then began having meetings with Sydney Pollack without telling the producers; irritated, they fired Redford.

Zanuck and Brown then hired Sidney Lumet to direct, sending him all versions of the script. After several rewrites, Lumet decided the story's original grittiness was fast devolving and chose Mamet's original script. This was agreed to by Paul Newman, who ultimately agreed to star. Lumet recalled that they had to rework only one or two scenes, mainly giving the trial a resolution as Zanuck and Brown had originally requested. Unlike Zanuck, when Lumet approached Mamet, he was able to get his approval to make that change to his original work.

Lumet then recruited Warden and Mason, both of whom he had worked with before. He wasn't sure if Mason, a renowned actor in that era, would take a supporting role, but Mason liked Mamet's script and did not object.

Prior to filming, Lumet held extensive dress rehearsals, standard practice for Lumet's films but not common on Hollywood productions. Newman was appreciative as they proved crucial in developing his performance, giving him the time he needed to tap into the emotional bankruptcy of his character.

At one point during production, Newman barely avoided serious injury when a light estimated to weigh several hundred pounds fell about three feet away from him after breaking through its supports. The wood planks were apparently weakened by overnight rain.

Bruce Willis and Tobin Bell have uncredited background appearances. They are seated together as extras in the final courtroom scene.

The producers were reluctant to keep the scene where Newman strikes Rampling, believing it would turn the audience against his character and even damage his public image. Newman insisted on keeping it, believing it was right for the story.

After the film was finished, the studio's executives sent Lumet several suggestions and urged him to rework the ending with Galvin finally answering Laura's phone call, but Zanuck said that Lumet had final cut authority, and the film would remain as completed.

Reception
Rotten Tomatoes gives the film an approval rating of 89%, with an average rating of 7.8/10, based on 36 reviews. The website's critics consensus reads: "Paul Newman is at the peak of his powers as an attorney who never lived up to his potential in The Verdict, supported by David Mamet's crackling script and Sidney Lumet's confident direction."  

In a poll of 500 films held by Empire magazine, it was voted 254th Greatest Movie of all time. In 2013, the Writers Guild of America ranked the screenplay #91 on its list of the "101 greatest screenplays ever written". Richard D. Pepperman praised the scene in which Judge Hoyle eats breakfast and offers Galvin coffee as "a terrific use of objects, making for a believable judge in his personal, comfortable and suitable place, as well as a Physical Action (motion) that demonstrates the subtext of the Judge's objective (in support of the insurance company, the doctor and their attorney) without an abundance of expository dialogue."

The film opened in 3 theaters in New York City and grossed $143,265 in its first 5 days. The following weekend it expanded to 615 screens and grossed $2,331,805, finishing seventh for the weekend, and went on to gross $54 million.

The film is recognized by the American Film Institute in these lists:
 AFI's 100 Years...100 Heroes and Villains: Frank Galvin – Nominated Hero
 2006: AFI's 100 Years...100 Cheers – #75
 2008: AFI's 10 Top 10: #4 Courtroom Drama Film

Notes

See also
 Trial movies

References

External links

 
 
 
 
 

20th Century Fox films
1982 drama films
1982 films
American legal drama films
American courtroom films
1980s English-language films
Films scored by Johnny Mandel
Films about alcoholism
Films about lawyers
Films about medical malpractice
Films based on American novels
Films directed by Sidney Lumet
Films produced by David Brown
Films produced by Richard D. Zanuck
Films set in 1982
Films set in Boston
Films set in New York City
Films shot in Massachusetts
Films shot in New York City
Films shot in Toronto
Films with screenplays by David Mamet
Films set in hospitals
1980s American films